Barry Cahill (May 28, 1921 – April 9, 2012) was a Canadian-born American film, theater and television actor, whose professional career spanned more than fifty years. His film credits included Grand Theft Auto, and Sweet Bird of Youth. His television roles included The Travels of Jaimie McPheeters, The Young and the Restless, Dynasty, and Santa Barbara.

Early life
Cahill was born in Vancouver, British Columbia, on May 28, 1921, to Stephen and Theresa Cahill.

Career
He portrayed Sam Powers on The Young and the Restless soap opera during the mid-1970s. On television he appeared regularly during the 1960s through early 1980s, on such network shows as Rescue 8 (in 3 episodes), Perry Mason (2), Have Gun – Will Travel (6), Bonanza (2), Ben Casey (2), 12 O'Clock High (4), The Virginian (5), Mission: Impossible (3),  Gunsmoke (4), The Rookies (2), Ironside (9), Kolchak: The Night Stalker (2), The Streets of San Francisco (2), M*A*S*H, The Six Million Dollar Man (4), Emergency!  (3), The Waltons (3), Lou Grant (2) and Quincy M.E.  (4).

Personal life and death
Cahill died on April 9, 2012, at the age of 90. For 43 years he was married to actress Rachel Ames. He had a daughter, Christine; step-daughter Susan; and two grandchildren, Jocelyn and Marc.

Filmography
Imitation General (1958) - Jeep Driver (uncredited)
Battle of the Coral Sea (1959) - Bomber Pilot (uncredited)
Then There Were Three (1961) - Sgt. Travers
13 West Street (1962) - Policeman (uncredited)
Sweet Bird of Youth (1962) - Bud
Blindfold (1965) - CIA Agent on Phone (uncredited)
Torn Curtain (1966) - American Correspondent (uncredited)
Valley of the Dolls (1967) - Rough Character in San Francisco Bar (uncredited)
Hang 'Em High (1968) - Search Party
Daddy's Gone A-Hunting (1969) - FBI Agent Crosley
The Happy Ending (1969) - Handsome Man
...tick...tick...tick... (1970) - Bob Braddock
The Christine Jorgensen Story (1970) - Reporter
Doctors' Wives (1971) - Attendant (uncredited)
The Groundstar Conspiracy (1972) - Reporter
Coffy (1973) - McHenry
The Stone Killer (1973) - Steinholtz
Westworld (1973) - 3rd Male Interviewee (uncredited)
Teenager (1974)
Half a House (1975) - Her husband
Grand Theft Auto (1977) - Bigby Powers
Straight Time (1978) - Salesman #2
When You Comin' Back, Red Ryder? (1979) - Customs Doctor
Wrong Is Right (1982) - Husband

Selected Television

References

External links
 
 

1921 births
2012 deaths
Male actors from Vancouver
American male film actors
American male television actors
American male stage actors
Canadian male television actors
Canadian emigrants to the United States
Male actors from Los Angeles